Camp 14 was one of three main prisoner of war (POW) and internee camps, located at Loveday, in South Australia's Riverland, approximately 30 kilometres from Renmark.  This camp was divided into four compounds and held Axis prisoners from various locations around the world, including Papua New Guinea, the Pacific, the Middle East and North Africa.  The camp guard was provided by members of 25/33 Garrison Battalion, a militia unit of the Australian Army.

The four compounds were numbered and prisoners were divided into their specific nationalities. 14A held Italian prisoners, 14B and 14C held Japanese prisoners and 14D held German and Italian prisoners.  Prisoners first started to arrive at Camp 14 between the months of January and February 1942.  The camp officially closed in 1946, when the last prisoners were repatriated to their home countries.

See also

 List of POW camps in Australia
 Loveday Camp 9
 Loveday Camp 10
 Italian prisoners of war in Australia

External links
 Segment from SA Life re the Loveday camps
 Details of Loveday Camp 14
 Australian National Archives factsheet about Loveday POW & Internee Camp, South Australia
 Loveday Project: Japanese civilians interned

World War II prisoner-of-war camps in Australia
Military camps in Australia
History of South Australia
Riverland